Eugène Henri Brisson (31 July 183514 April 1912) was a French statesman, Prime Minister of France for a period in 1885-1886 and again in 1898.

Biography
He was born at Bourges (Cher), and followed his father's profession of advocate.  Having made his mark in opposition during the last days of the empire, he was appointed deputy-mayor of Paris after the government was overthrown. He was elected to the Assembly on 8 February 1871, as a member of the extreme Left. While not approving of the Commune, he was the first to propose amnesty for the condemned (on 13 September 1871), but the proposal was voted down. He strongly supported compulsory primary education, and was firmly anti-clerical. He was president of the chamber from 1881—replacing Léon Gambetta—to March 1885, when he became prime minister upon the resignation of Jules Ferry; but he resigned when, after the general elections of that year, he only just obtained a majority for the vote of credit for the Tongking expedition.

He remained conspicuous as a public man, took a prominent part in exposing the Panama scandals, was a powerful candidate for the presidency after the murder of President Carnot in 1894, and was again president of the chamber from December 1894 to 1898. In June of the latter year he formed a cabinet when the country was violently excited over the Dreyfus affair; his firmness and honesty increased popular respect for him, but a chance vote on a matter of especial excitement overthrew his ministry in October. As a leader of the radicals he actively supported, the ministries of Waldeck-Rousseau and Combes, especially concerning the laws on the religious orders and the separation of church and state. In 1895 he was a candidate for the presidency but lost to Félix Faure. In May 1906 he was elected president of the chamber of deputies by 500 out of 581 votes.

Brisson's 1st Ministry, 6 April 18857 January 1886

Henri Brisson – President of the Council and Minister of Justice
Charles de Freycinet – Minister of Foreign Affairs
Jean-Baptiste Campenon – Minister of War
François Allain-Targé – Minister of the Interior
Jean Clamageran – Minister of Finance
Charles Eugène Galiber – Minister of Marine and Colonies
René Goblet – Minister of Public Instruction, Fine Arts, and Worship
Hervé Mangon – Minister of Agriculture
Sadi Carnot – Minister of Public Works
Ferdinand Sarrien – Minister of Posts and Telegraphs
Pierre Legrand – Minister of Commerce

Changes
16 April 1885 – Sadi Carnot succeeds Clamageran as Minister of Finance.  Charles Demôle succeeds Carnot as Minister of Public Works.
9 November 1885 – Pierre Gomot succeeds Mangon as Minister of Agriculture. Lucien Dautresme succeeds Legrand as Minister of Commerce.

Brisson's Second Ministry, 28 June1 November 1898

Henri Brisson – President of the Council and Minister of the Interior
Théophile Delcassé – Minister of Foreign Affairs
Godefroy Cavaignac – Minister of War
Paul Peytral – Minister of Finance
Ferdinand Sarrien – Minister of Justice and Worship
Édouard Locroy – Minister of Marine
Léon Bourgeois – Minister of Public Instruction and Fine Arts
Albert Viger – Minister of Agriculture
Georges Trouillot – Minister of Colonies
Louis Tillaye – Minister of Public Works
Émile Maruéjouls – Minister of Commerce, Industry, Posts, and Telegraphs

Changes
5 September 1898 – Émile Zurlinden succeeds Cavaignac as Minister of War
17 September 1898 – Charles Chanoine succeeds Zurlinden as Minister of War.  Jules Godin succeeds Tillaye as Minister of Public Works.
25 October 1898 – Édouard Locroy succeeds Chanoine as interim Minister of War, remaining also Minister of Marine.

References

Attribution:

External links

 

|-
 
 

|-
 
 

|-
 
 

|-
 
 

|-
 
 
|-
 
 

|-

 

1835 births
1912 deaths
Politicians from Bourges
Republican Union (France) politicians
Radical Party (France) politicians
Prime Ministers of France
French interior ministers
Government ministers of France
Members of the National Assembly (1871)
Presidents of the Chamber of Deputies (France)
Members of the 1st Chamber of Deputies of the French Third Republic
Members of the 2nd Chamber of Deputies of the French Third Republic
Members of the 3rd Chamber of Deputies of the French Third Republic
Members of the 4th Chamber of Deputies of the French Third Republic
Members of the 5th Chamber of Deputies of the French Third Republic
Members of the 6th Chamber of Deputies of the French Third Republic
Members of the 7th Chamber of Deputies of the French Third Republic
Members of the 8th Chamber of Deputies of the French Third Republic
Members of the 9th Chamber of Deputies of the French Third Republic
Members of the 10th Chamber of Deputies of the French Third Republic
People associated with the Dreyfus affair
Burials at Montmartre Cemetery